Bracht–Wachter bodies are a finding in infective endocarditis consisting of yellow-white miliary spots in the myocardium.

Histologically, these are collections of chronic inflammatory cells, mainly lymphocytes and histiocytes.

History
They were described by two Germans, Erich Franz Eugen Bracht, a pathologist and obstetrician-gynecologist, and Hermann Julius Gustav Wächter, a physician.

Related findings
Other findings in infective endocarditis are:
Osler's nodes
Janeway lesions
Roth's spots
Flea-bitten kidneys- pyemic spots

References

Histopathology